The Comoros Swimming Federation is the national governing body for the sport of swimming in Comoros.

References

National members of the African Swimming Confederation
Sports governing bodies in the Comoros
Swimming in the Comoros